Victor Ivanovich Nikitin,(Russian: Виктор Иванович Никитин), was a Soviet tenor soloist of the Alexandrov Ensemble, born in Syzran 12 February 1911 and died in Moscow 6 January 1994. He is notable for being the first Mr Kalinka, and for being called "Ambassador Kalinka" by Erich Mückenberger after singing at the 1948 Berlin peace concert. He was buried at Pyatnitskoye cemetery in Moscow.

Early career

He was a machine engineer in 1938, and joined the Alexandrov Ensemble in the same year. He had possibly started recording by 1936. He was already known as "Mr Kalinka" before World War II.

World War II and 1948 Berlin peace concert

Apparently when he sang to entertain the Soviet troops at the Eastern Front in World War II, the Germans on the other side stopped shooting to listen. The German appreciation of Nikitin did not end there. At the Alexandrov Ensemble August 1948 Peace Concert, he sang encores of Kalinka and received high praise for his singing. Before the concert he had bought a book of 10 German folk songs, and then persuaded Boris Alexandrov and the Soviet commanders to let him sing some of them in German.  This would be seen by the German audience as a great commitment to peace.  In a photograph taken from the back of the choir at the time, you can see some of the 30,000-strong audience with the destroyed city as a backdrop.  You can just see the flowers along the front of the stage, and to the left of the photo, standing in front of the balalaika players is a young soloist, perhaps waiting for Boris to indicate the start of his song.  This is the scene which Nikitin, the choir and the orchestra saw on that day in 1948.

A 1985 Radio DDR recording (named Auf gutem Weg Mit Guten Freunden) exists of part of this 1948 Berlin concert.  Nikitin sang Im Schönsten Wiesengrunde, Ich Freue Mich Ihnen Mein Lied Zu Singen (a spoken introduction by Nikitin to Kalinka, recorded in 1988) and Kalinka. In connection with this, Nikitin was made Honoured Citizen of the German Democratic Republic. In 2007, Nikitin was still remembered by Leonid Maleev, director of the Ensemble, as the earliest "Mr Kalinka".

Return to choir

It has been rumoured that Nikitin was in disgrace after singing in German in 1948, and that this eventually ended his career in 1952; however it is now said that he simply returned to the Ensemble choir in 1952, by his own choice, due to a strained or tired voice. He continued to be popular with Stalin, who used to wave to him in a friendly manner at concerts. Nikitin could not have returned to the choir without Stalin's approval; however many relevant source-documents from this era have been destroyed.

Discography
With the Alexandrov Ensemble from 1938 to 1952 he recorded Meeting with the chief (music: A. Alexandrov; lyrics: P. Herman), Cold waves lapping (music: F. Bogoroditsky; lyrics: Ya Repninsky 1950), Samovary-samopaly (or Military samovars) duet with S. Tibaev (recorded 1941), Red Fleet sailors (recorded 1943) (music A. Alexandrov; lyrics N. Labkovsky 1943), Smuglyanka, duet with N. Ustinov (recorded 1945), Kalinka, Alas nothing to please me (1946) Prague, Come to me young laddie (1946) Prague, Nightingales (music: V. Soloviev-Gray; lyrics: A. Fat'yanov) (recorded 1946), Alas nothing to please me (1948) Moscow, Come to me young laddie (1948) Prague, Troika (1948) Prague, Im schönsten Wiesengrunde (1948) Berlin, Kalinka (1948) Berlin, Heidenröslein (1948) Dresden, Evening on the waterfront solo and as duet with V.N.Katerinsky, Winter evening (1951) Prague, Down by Mother Volga. He recorded Song of my country (1951 and 26 October 1952) Prague.

See also
 Alexandrov Ensemble
 Alexandrov Ensemble soloists
 Alexandrov Ensemble choir
 Alexandrov Ensemble discography

References

External links

1911 births
1994 deaths
Russian military personnel
Soviet tenors
Russian tenors
Burials at Pyatnitskoye Cemetery
20th-century Russian singers
20th-century Russian male singers